Bouwel is a railway station in Bouwel, Antwerp, Belgium. The station opened in 1855 on the Line 15.

Train services
The following services currently the serve the station:

Intercity services (IC-30) Antwerp - Herentals - Turnhout (weekends)
Local services (L-24) Antwerp - Herentals - Mol (weekdays)

Bus services
The following bus services call at the station. They are operated by De Lijn.

513 (Heist-op-den-Berg - Herenthout - Bouwel - Vorselaar)

References

Railway stations opened in 1855
Railway stations in Belgium
Railway stations in Antwerp Province
Grobbendonk
1855 establishments in Belgium